This is a list of the members of the 14th Riigikogu, the unicameral parliament of Estonia, following the 2019 election.

Election results

Lists

By party

Estonian Reform Party (34)

Estonian Centre Party (26)

Conservative People's Party (19)

Pro Patria (12)

Social Democratic Party (10)

By votes

Midterm replacements
 Vladimir Arhipov (Centre) relinquished his seat in advance for Kaido Höövelson.
 Vadim Belobrovtsev (Centre) relinquished his seat in advance for Viktor Vassiljev.
 Urmas Klaas (Reform) relinquished his seat in advance for Hele Everaus.
 Mihhail Kõlvart (Centre) relinquished his seat in advance for Erki Savisaar.
 Lauri Laats (Centre) relinquished his seat in advance for Igor Kravtšenko.
 Tõnis Lukas (Pro Patria) relinquished his seat in advance for Mihhail Lotman.
 Urmas Paet (Reform) relinquished his seat in advance for Erkki Keldo.
 Vladimir Svet (Centre) relinquished his seat in advance for Tõnis Mölder.
 Yana Toom (Centre) relinquished her seat in advance for Dmitri Dmitrijev.

References

14th